Gretna Green is a railway station on the Glasgow South Western Line, which runs between  and  via . It is owned by Network Rail and managed by ScotRail.

History
The station was opened by the Glasgow, Dumfries and Carlisle Railway on 23 August 1848 as Gretna. The Glasgow and South Western Railway renamed the station Gretna Green in April 1852.

On 6 December 1965, the station was closed and the station building was subsequently sold.

The station was reopened on 20 September 1993 by British Rail, with just one platform on the northern side of the line to the west of the previous station, coinciding with the western end of the points marking the end of the single track section from Annan. The second platform came into use when the line to Annan was restored to double track in August 2008.

The Glasgow, Dumfries and Carlisle Railway station was one of three serving the town of Gretna, the others being:
 Gretna, built by the Caledonian Railway. Opened on 9 September 1847 and closed on 10 September 1951.
 Gretna, built by the Border Union Railway. Opened on 1 November 1861 and closed on 9 August 1915.

Services
Following the May 2021 timetable change, there is a mostly an uneven hourly to 2 hourly service (Monday to Saturday) heading north-west towards Dumfries, with seven trains of these to Glasgow Central via Kilmarnock. On Sunday, there are five trains per day to Dumfries, two of which extend to Glasgow Central. Heading south-east towards Carlisle, there is an mostly hourly service. All services are operated by ScotRail.

Services running through Carlisle to Newcastle were stopped at the May 2022 timetable change.

Rolling stock used: Class 156 Super Sprinter

Gallery

Notes

References

Sources

 
 
 
 RAILSCOT on the Glasgow, Dumfries and Carlisle Railway
 Original Gretna Green railway station on a navigable Ordnance Survey map

External links
 
 

Railway stations in Dumfries and Galloway
Railway stations served by ScotRail
Railway stations in Great Britain opened in 1848
Railway stations in Great Britain closed in 1965
Railway stations in Great Britain opened in 1993
Reopened railway stations in Great Britain
Former Glasgow and South Western Railway stations
Beeching closures in Scotland
Gretna, Dumfries and Galloway
1848 establishments in Scotland